Gloucester River, a perennial river and major tributary of the Manning River catchment, is located in the Mid North Coast hinterland New South Wales, Australia.

Course and features
Gloucester River rises within Gloucester Tops, on the eastern slopes of the Great Dividing Range, south east of Gloucester, and flows generally east northeast, joined by six tributaries including the Avon, Barrington, and Bowman rivers, before reaching its confluence with the Manning River, west of Wingham. The river descends  over its  course.

The headwaters of the river originate in the World Heritage Barrington Tops region, flowing through the Barrington Tops National Park comprising Antarctic Beech and Southern Sassafras high altitude rainforest. In the middle and lower reaches, the river flows through subtropical rainforest that includes Red Cedar and Rosewood trees.

See also 

 Rivers of New South Wales
 List of rivers of New South Wales (A–K)
 List of rivers of Australia

Gallery

References

External links
 
 
 
 
 

Rivers of New South Wales
Rivers of the Hunter Region
Dungog Shire
Mid-Coast Council